A Strange Loop is a musical with book, music, and lyrics by Michael R. Jackson, and winner of the 2020 Pulitzer Prize for Drama. First produced off-Broadway in 2019, then staged in Washington, D.C. in 2021, A Strange Loop premiered on Broadway at the Lyceum Theatre in April 2022. The show won Best Musical and Best Book of a Musical at the 75th Tony Awards.

The show follows Usher, a Black queer man writing a musical about a Black queer man writing a musical. The title refers to a cognitive science term coined by Douglas Hofstadter, as well as a song by Liz Phair.

Plot summary

The chorus, Usher's Thoughts, calls Usher's name many times. Usher, working as an usher for The Lion King, tells the audience what the show will entail. Usher wonders how he should write A Strange Loop to represent what it's like to "travel the world in a fat, Black, queer body" ("Intermission Song").

After work, Usher plans "to change this show for the better". Usher wants to change himself, but his Thoughts, full of self-loathing and worry, are too disruptive ("Today"). His mother calls to ask "what's going on in [his] life" and reminds him how hard she and his father worked to raise him. She requests that Usher write a Tyler Perry-style gospel play in return ("We Wanna Know").

Usher wishes he could act more like his "inner white girl" but is held back by expectations put on Black boys ("Inner White Girl"). Usher's Thoughts criticize "Inner White Girl" and the show, claiming the main character should have more sex appeal and telling him to add elements of "slavery or police violence so that the allies in the audience have something 'intersectional' to hold onto".

Usher’s father leaves a voicemail saying that he found Scott Rudin’s number online. Because Usher has student loans to pay off, his father urges him to leverage their common sexuality to make a connection, despite not condoning homosexuality ("Didn't Want Nothin'").

At a medical checkup, Usher's doctor inquires about Usher's sex life and prescribes him Truvada, pressuring Usher to have more sex. Usher "enters the sexual marketplace" through various gay dating apps but is rejected for being "too Black, too fat, too feminine," and for having a small dick. Usher rages against the ways in which the gay community is also discriminatory ("Exile In Gayville").

A stranger on a train asks what Usher is writing. Usher explains that "A Strange Loop" is a cognitive science term about how "your ability to conceive of yourself as an 'I' is ... an illusion. But the fact that you can recognize the illusion proves it exists." The stranger introduces himself as Joshlet, and the two flirt before Joshlet reveals that he's a figment of Usher's imagination. Joshlet dismisses Usher, who sings about how "the second-wave feminist in [him] is at war with the dick-sucking Black gay man" ("Second Wave").

Usher's agent informs him that Tyler Perry is seeking a ghostwriter for a gospel play, but Usher has a low opinion of Perry’s work. Appearing as famous Black figures such as Harriet Tubman, Carter G Woodson, James Baldwin, Zora Neale Hurston, and Whitney Houston, his Thoughts accuse him of being a race traitor and persuade him to take the job for "for the money. And Mom. And Dad. And the ancestors" ("Tyler Perry Writes Real Life"). Usher writes the play, acting out all the characters as caricatures ("Writing a Gospel Play").

Back at work, Usher tells a patron he can't continue the show without confronting his parents with his artistic self. The patron advises him to live his life without fear ("A Sympathetic Ear"). Usher's father calls to ask if he has HIV like his cousin Darnell had. The rest of his family appears, and the call quickly devolves. His mother asks where her gospel play is. 

Usher hooks up with a white man, Inwood Daddy, who fetishizes him and calls him racial slurs ("Inwood Daddy"). After Usher leaves, he questions where his boundaries are ("Boundaries"). 

His mother leaves a voicemail wishing him a happy birthday, also telling him homosexuality is a sin ("Periodically"). His father calls to tell him their church community doesn't approve of his music ("Didn’t Want Nothin' (reprise)"). Usher's parents argue with him over his homosexuality and worry he might catch AIDS before Usher explodes about how his upbringing, repressed sexuality, and lack of support from his father hurt him. Usher and his mother fight about her portrayal in the play, and she accuses Usher of hating and disappointing her.

The set transforms into a gospel play with Usher as a church pastor and the Thoughts as a choir. Usher recalls how Darnell, thinking he deserved to die for his sins, refused HIV medication in the hospital. Usher realizes "the only thing worse than dying of AIDS would be living with it and hearing the people you loved say 'I told you so.'" Usher's mother stops the show ("Precious Little Dream/AIDS Is God's Punishment"). She tells Usher he is loved but thinks he's struggling because homosexuality is a sin, wishing they could "work this gay abomination thang out".

The Thought playing his mother asks if he wants to end the show with hateful caricatures of his parents. Usher says he was trying to depict life as it was when he was seventeen, but the Thought reminds him that he is now twenty-six. Usher realizes that for his perceptions of his parents to change, he must change as well. He sings about what it was like to be "one lone, Black gay boy ...who chose to turn his back on the Lord" ("Memory Song"). With his back to the audience, Usher wonders what will happen when the show ends. He turns, reflecting on himself, his relationship with others, and what would happen if he were to change, and comes to the conclusion that "change is just an illusion" and that they are in a strange loop.

Cast and characters

Musical numbers
"Intermission Song" – Usher, Thoughts
"Today" – Usher, Thoughts
"We Wanna Know" – Thoughts
"Inner White Girl" – Usher, Thoughts
"Didn't Want Nothin'" – Thought 5, Thoughts
"Exile in Gayville" – Usher, Thoughts
"Second Wave" – Usher
"Tyler Perry Writes Real Life" – Usher, Thought 3, Thoughts
"Writing a Gospel Play" – Usher, Thoughts
"A Sympathetic Ear" – Thought 1
"Inwood Daddy" – Usher, Thought 6, Thoughts
"Boundaries" – Usher
"Periodically" – Thought 4, Usher
"Didn't Want Nothin' Reprise" – Thought 5
"Precious Little Dream / AIDS Is God's Punishment" – Usher, Thoughts
"Memory Song" – Usher, Thoughts 2-6
"A Strange Loop" – Usher, Thoughts

Productions

Off-Broadway (2019) 
A Strange Loop began previews at off-Broadway venue Playwrights Horizons on May 24, 2019. It opened on June 17, 2019 with closing scheduled for July 7, 2019, before extending to July 28, 2019. The show featured Larry Owens as Usher. The creative team credits included Michael R. Jackson as writer of book, music, and lyrics, Stephen Brackett as director, Raja Feather Kelly as choreographer, Charlie Rosen as orchestrator, and Rona Siddiqui as music director.

Washington, D.C. (2021) 
The Washington, DC production at Woolly Mammoth Theatre Company was originally scheduled for September 2020, but postponed to December 2021 due to the COVID-19 pandemic. The six-week limited run began previews November 22, 2021 and opened December 3, 2021. The show extended another week, changing its closing date from January 2 to January 9, 2022.

Broadway (2022-2023) 
The Broadway production of A Strange Loop was announced December 20, 2021. Many notable people from the entertainment industry served as the show's producers. They included lead producer Barbara Whitman, as well as Benj Pasek, Justin Paul, Jennifer Hudson, RuPaul Charles, Marc Platt, Megan Ellison of Annapurna Pictures, Don Cheadle, Frank Marshall, James L. Nederlander, Alan Cumming, Ilana Glazer, Mindy Kaling and Billy Porter. Previews were scheduled to begin on April 6, but were postponed to April 14 due to COVID-19 breakouts among the cast. The show officially opened April 26, 2022. In October 2022, it was announced that the show would play its final performance on Broadway on January 15, 2023.

London (2023) 
The London production will open at the Barbican Centre from 17 June 2023 for a limited run until 9 September. It will be produced by Howard Panter for Trafalgar Theatre Productions, the National Theatre, Barbara Whitman and Wessex Grove. Casting is to be announced.

Cast recordings
The original off-Broadway cast recording was released on September 27, 2019, on Yellow Sound Label. The album peaked at number 6 on the Billboard Cast Albums chart. A Broadway cast album was recorded on April 10, 2022 and released on June 10, 2022 through Sh-K-Boom Records, Yellow Sound Label, Barbara Whitman Productions, and Ghostlight Records. It debuted at number two on the Cast Albums chart. The cast recording received a Grammy nomination for Best Musical Theater Album for the 65th Annual Grammy Awards, to be held in February 2023.

Box office 
On June 14, 2022, Deadline reported that the musical filled 98% of its available seats during the week ending June 12. The musical grossed $676,316 for seven performances. The musical also broke the Lyceum Theatre box office house record for a standard 8-performance week, taking $860,496 for the week ending June 26, a $15,183 bump over the previous week. As of September 2022, A Strange Loop grossed around $14.2 million from 136,777 attendance and 157 performance.

Awards and nominations 
On May 4, 2020, the Pulitzer Prize for Drama was awarded to Jackson for the musical, with the committee citing the show as "a metafictional musical that tracks the creative process of an artist transforming issues of identity, race, and sexuality that once pushed him to the margins of the cultural mainstream into a meditation on universal human fears and insecurities." The show is the tenth musical to win the award, as well as the first musical written by a Black person to win and first musical to win without a Broadway run. The show premiered on Broadway in April 2022 and won the Tony Award for Best Musical. As one of its producers, Jennifer Hudson became the second Black woman to receive all four of the major American entertainment awards (EGOT).

The cast recording received a nomination for the Grammy Award for Best Musical Theater Album for the 2023 Grammy Awards, which it lost to the 2022 Broadway cast recording of Into the Woods.

Off-Broadway

Broadway

References

All-Black cast Broadway shows
Off-Broadway musicals
2019 musicals
Plays set in the 21st century
Plays about race and ethnicity
Original musicals
LGBT-related musicals
Pulitzer Prize for Drama-winning musicals
Drama Desk Award-winning musicals
Tony Award-winning musicals